is a town located in Kasuya District, Fukuoka Prefecture, Japan.

As of 2016, the town has an estimated population of 37,663 and a density of 1,200 persons per km². The total area is 30.22 km².

The town has a river, the Umigawa, flowing through it, a large Hachiman shrine and a small Protestant church. It also has some ancient burial mounds (kofun). It is reputedly the birthplace of Emperor Ōjin, an early Japanese emperor.

A railway was built in 1919 to facilitate the removal of coal, but this local industry ended in 1963. The railway line was closed in 1985 and has been made into a pleasant semi-rural walkway. Umi still has another JR line, the Kashii Line. Ban-dai sake is also made in Umi.

References

External links

Umi official website 

Towns in Fukuoka Prefecture